The Bar-Kays are an American funk band formed in 1964. The band had dozens of charting singles from the 1960s to the 1980s, including "Soul Finger" (US Billboard Hot 100 number 17, R&B number 3) in 1967, "Son of Shaft" (R&B number 10) in 1972, and "Boogie Body Land" (R&B number 7) in 1980.

Biography

Black rock years
The Bar-Kays began in Memphis, Tennessee, as a studio session group, backing major artists at Stax Records. In 1967, they were chosen by Otis Redding to play as his backing band, and were tutored for that role by Al Jackson, Jr., Booker T. Jones, and the other members of Booker T. & the M.G.'s. Their first single, "Soul Finger", was issued on April 14, 1967, reaching number 3 on the US Billboard R&B Singles chart and number 17 on the Billboard Hot 100.

On December 10, 1967, Redding and four members of the band—Jimmie King (born June 8, 1949; guitar), Ronnie Caldwell (born December 27, 1948; electric organ), Phalon Jones (born 1948; saxophone), and Carl Cunningham (born 1948; drums)—and their partner, Matthew Kelly, died when their airplane crashed into Lake Monona, near Madison, Wisconsin, while attempting to land at Truax Field. Redding and the band were scheduled to play their next concerts in Madison. Trumpeter Ben Cauley was the only survivor of the crash. Bassist James Alexander was on another plane, as the plane carrying Redding held only seven passengers. Cauley and Alexander rebuilt the group.

The re-formed band consisted of Cauley; Alexander; Harvey Henderson, saxophone; Michael Toles, guitar; Ronnie Gorden, organ; Willie Hall, drums; and later Larry Dodson (formerly of fellow Stax act the Temprees), lead vocals. The group backed dozens of major Stax artists on recordings, including Isaac Hayes on his album Hot Buttered Soul.

Cauley left the group in 1971, leaving Alexander, Dodson (vocals, vibes), Barry Wilkins (guitar), Winston Stewart (keyboards), Henderson (tenor sax, flute), Charles "Scoops" Allen (trumpet), and Alvin Hunter (drums) to create the album Black Rock. Lloyd Smith joined in 1973, and the band changed musical direction during the 1970s, forging a successful career in funk music. With the Stax/Volt label folding in 1975, the group signed with Mercury Records.

Funk years
In 1976, Dodson (vocals), Alexander (bass), Lloyd Smith (guitar), Allen (trumpet), Henderson (saxophone), Frank Thompson (trombone), Stewart (keyboards), and Mike Beard (drums) brought their "Shake Your Rump to the Funk" track into the R&B Top Five. In autumn 1977, the group came out with Flying High on Your Love, an album that featured "Shut the Funk Up", a "near-perfect disco song punctuated by the funky horn triumvirate of Charles 'Scoop' Allen, Harvey 'Joe' Henderson, and Frank 'Captain Disaster' Thompson and dominated by vocalist Larry 'D' Dodson's call to 'get on up or just shut the funk up'". The group peaked as a funk band from the late 1970s to the late 1980s. They released singles such as "Move Your Boogie Body" (1979), "Hit and Run" (1981), "Freak Show on the Dance Floor" (1984), "Certified True" (1987), "Struck by You" (1989).

In 1983, Sherman Guy left the group, and Larry 'LJ' Johnson took his place on vocals and percussion. Charles Allen left the group just before it took a more commercial direction. The Bar-Kays continued to have hits on R&B charts well into the 1980s.

Guitarist Marcus Price, a member of the band, was murdered in 1984. The crime has never been solved by the Memphis police.

The band took an extended break in the late 1980s but regrouped in 1991, with Alexander once again being the only original member. Since 1991, Larry Dodson, Archie Love, Bryan Smith, and Tony Gentry have been added to the group.

Alexander's son is the award-winning rapper and record producer Phalon "Jazze Pha" Alexander, named after Phalon Jones, who died in the 1967 plane crash. In 2013, the group was inducted into the Memphis Music Hall of Fame. On June 6, 2015, the Bar-Kays were inducted into the Official Rhythm & Blues Music Hall of Fame in Clarksdale, Mississippi.

Trumpeter Ben Cauley died in Memphis on September 21, 2015, at the age of 67.

In popular culture
The Bar-Kays appeared in the 1973 film documentary, Wattstax.

"Freakshow on the Dance Floor" was featured in the first breakdance scene in the 1984 movie, Breakin'.

In the 1985 movie, Spies Like Us, starring Dan Aykroyd and Chevy Chase, The Bar-Kays' hit "Soul Finger" was being played by the crew of a Soviet mobile ICBM platform on patrol in the Tajik S.S.R. Their songs "Too Hot To Stop" and "Soul Finger" are featured in the 2007 comedy film, Superbad. "Soul Finger" is also featured in the 2012 remake of Sparkle.

The Sugar Hill Gang's 1979 single "Rapper's Delight" contains multiple references to the Bar-Kays.

Discography

Albums

Singles

References

External links

James Alexander NAMM Oral History Interview (2015)

Accidental deaths in Wisconsin
American disco groups
American funk musical groups
American soul musical groups
Atlantic Records artists
Mercury Records artists
Musical groups established in 1966
Musical groups from Memphis, Tennessee
Victims of aviation accidents or incidents in the United States
1966 establishments in Tennessee
P-Vine Records artists
Stax Records artists
Rhino Records artists